Muhammad Mohassib (18431928) was an Egyptian antiquities dealer in Luxor, Egypt. He began working as a young donkey boy to Lucie, Lady Duff-Gordon and learned English from her. He opened an antiquities shop in Luxor in the early 1880s and became well-known among especially British and French archaeologists and dealers. A lot of important collections in museums in Europe and the US were partly bought from Mohassib. For example, the Museum of Fine Arts, Boston (US) purchased a "Head of a King" from Mohassib in 1904.

Americans Theodore M. Davis and Emma Andrews bought a number of pieces from Mohassib the entire time they were travelling through Egypt (1889-1913). E. A. Wallis Budge of the British Museum corresponded with Mohassib, who would regularly arrange to purchase items from him. As with any antiquities dealers in this period, Mohassib frequently sold items stolen from "inadequately supervised excavations" around Luxor, and Davis and Andrews were reasonably certain they regularly bought back items from their own sites. Because of this, it is difficult to ascertain the provenance of many items coming from his shop.

Upon his death on April 6, 1928, in Luxor, Percy Newberry memorialized him in the Journal of Egyptian Archaeology.

Further reading
 E. A. Wallis Budge, A Narrative of Journeys in Egypt and Mesopotamia on Behalf of the British Museum Between the Years 1886 and 1913 London: John Murray, 1920.

References

Egyptology
1843 births
1928 deaths